This is a list of National Historic Sites in its capital city, Ottawa, Ontario.  There are 26 National Historic Sites in Ottawa, of which two (Laurier House and the Rideau Canal) are administered by Parks Canada (identified below by the beaver icon ).  The Rideau Canal, which extends to Lake Ontario at Kingston, was designated in 1925 and was the first site designated in Ottawa.

There are six other National Historic Sites located within the National Capital Region, but not within Ottawa proper: the Former Almonte Post Office and Rosamond Woollen Mill in Almonte, the Gillies Grove and House in Arnprior, the Manoir Papineau in Montebello, the Symmes Hotel in the Aylmer sector of Gatineau, and the First Geodetic Survey Station in Chelsea.

Numerous National Historic Events also occurred in Ottawa, and are identified at places associated with them, using the same style of federal plaque which marks National Historic Sites. Several National Historic Persons are commemorated throughout the city in the same way. The markers do not indicate which designation—a Site, Event, or Person—a subject has been given.
National Historic Sites located elsewhere in Ontario are listed at National Historic Sites in Ontario.

This list uses names designated by the national Historic Sites and Monuments Board, which may differ from other names for these sites.

National Historic Sites

See also

History of Ottawa
List of designated heritage properties in Ottawa

References

 
Ottawa
National Historic Sites of Canada

Ottawa
Lists of historic places in Ontario